Murray Road is a road in Hong Kong. It is sometimes considered a boundary between Admiralty and Central. Along with a few other places in the area, it was named after Sir George Murray, a soldier and politician from Scotland.

Notable buildings and places along the road
Chater Garden
AIA Central (formerly Furama Kempinski Hotel)
Edinburgh Place
Murray Road Multi-storey Car Park Building

See also
 List of streets and roads in Hong Kong
 Murray House
 Murray Battery
 Murray Barracks

References

Admiralty, Hong Kong
Roads on Hong Kong Island